Pier Mario Biava is an Italian occupational doctor. For several years, he has been researching the connection between cancer and cell differentiation. Currently, He is active at the Institute of Multimedia Scientific Hospitalization and Care in Milan. He is also the author of over 100 scientific publications and six books. He is also the co-founder of the Novacell Biotech Company based in Milan, which produces food supplements and cosmetics for the prevention of aging and the onset of degenerative diseases.

Education
Pier Mario Biava received his medical degree from the University of Pavia and went on to specialize in occupational medicine and hygiene at the Universities of Padua and Trieste, respectively.

Research and career
For several years he has been studying the relationship between cancer and cell differentiation: he has identified specific networks of stem cell growth factors, which as epigenetic regulators are able to control the expression of various genes capable of slowing down cellular aging and regenerating different types of tissue without the need for stem cell transplantation.

He has also identified specific networks of differentiation factors capable of reprogramming pathological stem cells, such as cancer and cells of the germinative layer of the epidermis altered in psoriasis. He also emphasized that in order to reprogram altered stem cells or to regenerate a tissue it is necessary to regulate many genes at the same time and not a single gene.

Books 

 Cancer and the Search for Lost Meaning: The Discovery of a Revolutionary New Cancer Treatment.
 Information Medicine: The Revolutionary Cell-Reprogramming Discovery that Reverses Cancer and Degenerative Diseases.

Publications
 Cancer: A Problem of Developmental Biology; Scientific Evidence for Reprogramming and Differentiation Therapy.
Active Fraction from Embryo Fish Extracts Induces Reversion of the Malignant Invasive Phenotype in Breast Cancer through Down-regulation of TCTP and Modulation of E-cadherin/Î²-catenin Pathway.  
Autism Spectrum Disorder from the Womb to Adulthood: Suggestions for a Paradigm Shift. 
The zebrafish embryo derivative affects cell viability of epidermal cells: a possible role in the treatment of psoriasis. 
Changing the endocrine dependence of breast cancer: data and hypotheses. 
Exosomes and Cell Communication: From Tumour-Derived Exosomes and Their Role in Tumour Progression to the Use of Exosomal Cargo for Cancer Treatment.

References 

 

Living people
Year of birth missing (living people)
University of Pavia alumni
Cancer researchers
Italian physicians
Italian medical researchers
Italian medical writers